Mohammed Rubel Rana (born 2 April 1983) is a Bangladeshi swimmer, who specialized in backstroke events. He was one of the five athletes to represent Bangladesh at the 2008 Summer Olympics, rounding out the field of 45 swimmers in the men's 100 m backstroke.

Rana was invited by FINA to compete for Bangladesh in the men's 100 m backstroke at the 2008 Summer Olympics in Beijing. Swimming on the outside in heat one, Rana closed out the field to last place with a lifetime best in 1:04.82, more than eight seconds away from the heat's fastest swimmer and 2004 Olympian Danil Bugakov of Uzbekistan. Rana failed to advance to the semifinals, as he rounded out the roster of 45 swimmers in the prelims. Rana was also the nation's flag bearer at the opening ceremony.

References

External links
 
NBC 2008 Olympics profile

1983 births
Living people
Bangladeshi male swimmers
Olympic swimmers of Bangladesh
Swimmers at the 2008 Summer Olympics
Male backstroke swimmers
Swimmers at the 2002 Asian Games
Swimmers at the 2006 Asian Games
Sportspeople from Dhaka
Asian Games competitors for Bangladesh
South Asian Games silver medalists for Bangladesh
South Asian Games bronze medalists for Bangladesh
South Asian Games medalists in swimming